The following lists events that happened during 2019 in China.

Incumbents

Paramount leader
 General Secretary of the Communist Party – Xi Jinping

Head of state
 President – Xi Jinping
 Vice President – Wang Qishan

Head of government
 Premier – Li Keqiang
 Vice Premiers – Han Zheng, Sun Chunlan, Hu Chunhua, Liu He

National legislature
 Congress chairman – Li Zhanshu

Political advisory
 Conference chairman – Wang Yang

Supervision commission
 Director: Yang Xiaodu

Governors 
 Governor of Anhui Province – Li Guoying
 Governor of Fujian Province – Tang Dengjie 
 Governor of Gansu Province – Tang Renjian
 Governor of Guangdong Province – Ma Xingrui 
 Governor of Guizhou Province – Shen Yiqin 
 Governor of Hainan Province – Shen Xiaoming 
 Governor of Hebei Province – Xu Qin
 Governor of Heilongjiang Province – Wang Wentao 
 Governor of Henan Province – Chen Run'er (until 25 October), Yin Hong (starting 25 October)
 Governor of Hubei Province – Wang Xiaodong
 Governor of Hunan Province – Xu Dazhe 
 Governor of Jiangsu Province – Wu Zhenglong
 Governor of Jiangxi Province – Yi Lianhong
 Governor of Jilin Province – Jing Junhai 
 Governor of Liaoning Province – Tang Yijun 
 Governor of Qinghai Province – Liu Ning
 Governor of Shaanxi Province – Liu Guozhong 
 Governor of Shandong Province – Gong Zheng 
 Governor of Shanxi Province – Lou Yangsheng (until December), Lin Wu (starting December)
 Governor of Sichuan Province – Yin Li 
 Governor of Yunnan Province – vacant
 Governor of Zhejiang Province – Yuan Jiajun

Events

January
 January 3:
 At 15:07 – The Beijing Aerospace Command and Control Center issued a command for the separation of the lander and the patrol device from the Chang'e 4 relay satellite.
 At 22:22 – The patrol began to separate, and it(玉兔二號月球車) stepped on the far side of moon.

February
 February 23 – In Ningbo, Xiangshan, a fishing boat sank with 7 people. Two were rescued while five were missing.

March
 March 21 – 2019 Yancheng chemical plant explosion
 March 22 – Zaoyang car explosion
 March 30 – Muli County Forest Fire, causing 31 deaths, mainly firefighters

April
 April 11 – Shenzhen Short-term Extreme Heavy Rainfall, causing 11 deaths
 April 15 – Chinese first test-tube baby becomes mother.

May
 May 9 (Washington time) – US President Donald Trump announced that the punitive tariff rate on Mainland China goods of US$200 billion will be raised to 25% from May 10.
 May 9 (Beijing time)- At a regular press conference, A spokesman of the Ministry of Commerce said that China is well prepared to deal with all possible preparations.
 May 20- Google suspends business relationship with Huawei. This event comes following the arrest of Meng Wanzhou by Canadian authorities at the request of the United States due to sanctions against Iran.

June 

 June 4 – The 30th Anniversary of the 1989 Tiananmen Square Protests, Chinese authorities launched an extensive "stability maintenance" campaign. Hundreds of Twitter accounts were blocked. Internationally several organizations including the National Endowment for Democracy, the German Green Party Faction, and the British China Labour Solidarity have remembered the protests with events and protests.
 June 9 – Hundreds of thousands of people march in Hong Kong against a law critics fear could let China target political opponents in the territory.
 June 16 – Between 388,000 and 2,000,000 protesters take to the streets of Hong Kong against an anti-extradition law they believe will break down the firewall between Hong Kong and the mainland.
 June 17 - An earthquake with a magnitude of 5.8 kills 13 and injures less than 200.

July 
 July 1 － The "Regulations on the Management of Domestic Waste in Shanghai" came into effect, announcing that Shanghai entered the era of mandatory household waste classification.
 July 12 － the People's Bank of China held a press conference on financial statistics in the first half of 2019. Overall, the current banking system is reasonably abundant, the monetary credit and social financing scale are growing moderately, and the market interest rate is running smoothly.

August 
 August 10 – 32 are killed and 1,000,000 are evacuated as Typhoon Lekima makes landfall in Zhejiang. Earlier it had caused flooding in the Philippines.
 August 12 — Hong Kong flights are canceled due to protests.
 August 16 — Actress Liu Yifei posts a pro-Hong Kong police comment on Weibo, sparking a call for a boycott of the movie she stars in, Mulan.
 August 18 — As many as 1.7 million demonstrators march during a rainstorm in the 11th week of anti-government protests in Hong Kong.
 August 22
 YouTube announces that it has disabled 210 channels linked to the Hong Kong protest campaign. This follows similar actions by Twitter and Facebook.
 Protests in Hong Kong enter their 12th week as police reintroduced water-cannons and tear gas.

September
September 21 – Videos on Twitter and YouTube that show hundreds of shackled, blindfolded prisoners with shaved heads, presumed to be Uighur Muslims in Korla, Xinjiang, appear to be authentic.

October
October 1 — 70th anniversary of the People's Republic of China

December 
 December 31 – The World Health Organization was informed of a cluster of cases of pneumonia of unknown cause detected in Wuhan City, Hubei. The illness would come to be identified as coronavirus disease 2019 (also known as COVID-19), and the virus that causes the disease would be named severe acute respiratory syndrome coronavirus 2 (or SARS-CoV-2).

Popular culture

Film
List of Chinese films of 2019

Deaths

January
 January 1
 Ke Hua, Chinese diplomat (b. 1915)
 Tu Mingjing, Chinese materials scientist (b. 1928)
 January 2 – Gu Fangzhou, Chinese virologist (b. 1926)
 January 3 – Gao Chengyong, Chinese serial killer (b. 1964)
 January 4 – Zhang Lianwen, Chinese actor (b. 1945)
 January 5 – Sun Ganqing, Chinese general (b. 1919)
 January 8 – Gao Changqing, Chinese surgeon, member of the Chinese Academy of Engineering (b. 1960)
 January 10 – Deng Tietao, Chinese physician (b. 1916)
 January 15 – Bai Hua, Chinese novelist, playwright and poet (b. 1930)
 January 16 – Yu Min, Chinese physicist (b. 1926
 January 19 – Liang Jingkui, Chinese physical chemist (b. 1931)
 January 26 – Mao Dehua, Chinese geographer and politician, Vice Chairman of Xinjiang (b. 1935)
 January 29 – Jin Guozhang, Chinese pharmacologist, psychopathologist and educator (b. 1927)

February
 February 3 
 Ruan Xueyu, 86, pressure processing specialist
 Zhang Yumao, 83, literary scholar and politician
 February 4 – Fang Fukang, 83, physicist, President of Beijing Normal University
 February 6 – Ye Qingyao, 91, Taiwanese-born engineer and politician
 February 11 – He Bingsong, 87, legal scholar
 February 12
 Cheng Zhiqing, 84, chemist and politician, Vice Chairwoman of the Revolutionary Committee of the Chinese Kuomintang
 Zhan Ziqing, 81, historian, Vice President of Northeast Normal University
 February 13 – Zhang Li, 67, table tennis player
 February 16
 Fang Huai, 101, major general of the People's Liberation Army
 Gu Linfang, 90, police official and politician, Secretary-General of the Central Political and Legal Affairs Commission and Vice Minister of Public Security
 Li Rui, 101, politician and historian
 February 19 – Hu Peiquan, 98, aerospace engineer and educator
 February 20
 An Zuozhang, 92, historian
 Zhang Wenbin, 81, archaeologist, curator and politician, Director of the National Cultural Heritage Administration
 February 21 – E Dongchen, 79, earth scientist and polar explorer
 February 22
 Sun Wei, 83, civil engineer, member of the Chinese Academy of Engineering
 Wang Yening, 92, physicist, member of the Chinese Academy of Sciences
 February 24 – Li Xueqin, 85, historian and archaeologist

March
 March 4 – Mao Zhiyong, 89, politician, Party Secretary of Hunan and Jiangxi
 March 5
 Chu Shijian, 91, tobacco executive and entrepreneur
 Ding Yi, 91, engineer and business executive, founded Dongfang Electric
 Yang Naisi, 91, linguist
 March 7 – Shen Ziyin, 91, physician, academician of the Chinese Academy of Sciences
 March 11
 Leetsch C. Hsu, 98, mathematician and educator
 Xing Shizhong, 80, general, President of the PLA National Defence University
 March 23 – Li Fulin, 59, police official and politician, Vice Governor of Hainan

April
 April 3 – Guo Kun, 83, Antarctic explorer.
 April 6 – Lin Mingyu, 81, Chinese politician, Party Secretary of Haikou.
 April 7 – Xiong Zhaoren, 107, general.
 April 19 – Xiao Yang, 80, President of the Supreme People's Court.
 April 20 – Wu Yili, 89, one of the first pianists in China.
 April 26 – Hu Peizhao, 82, economist.

May

 May 2 – Li Xintian, 95, psychologist.
 May 4 – Yang Shengnan, 81, historian and palaeographer.
 May 5 – Feng Shunhua, 85, economist.
 May 9
 Yuan Baohua, 103, politician and academic administrator
 Zhan Wenshan, 78, physicist
 May 11 – Rong Baisheng, 88, architect and civil engineer
 May 12 – Dong Jian, 83, literary scholar
 May 13 – Hu Jinqing, 83, animator and director
 May 14 – Liu Housheng, 98, theatre director, critic, scholar, and playwright
 May 16
 Liu Xianjue, 87, architectural historian.
 I. M. Pei, Chinese-American architect (b. 1917)
 May 23 – Zhang Shiping, 72, businessman, chairman of China Hongqiao Group.
 May 25 – Mou Tun-fei, 78, film director

June
 June 3 – Tang Dingyuan (b.1920)
 June 9 – Wang Hanru (b.1938)
 Xu Datong (b.1929)
 June 10
 Hao Yun (b.1925)
 Wang Jun (b.1941)
 Yang Yang (b.1974/1975)
 June 14 – Ning Bin (b.1959)
 June 16 – Feng Chuanhan (b.1914)
 June 19
 Peng Xiaolian (b.1953)
 Su Huiyu (b.1935)
 June 24 – Wu Guoqing (b.1937)
 June 25
 Li Lun (b.1927)
 Xu Zhongyu (b.1915)
 June 27 – Yu Pufan (b.1923)
 June 29 
 Jiang Chongjing (b.1916)
 Sun Zhongliang (b.1936)

July

 July 2 – Li Zuixiong, conservation scientist.(b.1941)
 July 3 – Li Xintian, novelist.(b.1929)
 July 5
 Hu Maozhou, politician.(b.1928)
 Zhang Baifa, politician.(b.1935)
 July 7 – Liu Wenxi, painter.(b.1933)
 July 8 – Zhai Xiangjun, translator and educator.(b.1939)
 July 13 – Wang Jiafu, legal scholar.(b.1930)
 July 14 – Yu Dunkang, philosopher and historian of philosophy.(b.1930)
 July 15 – Feng Yuanwei, Chinese politician (b. 1930)
 July 16 – Su Shuyang, playwright, novelist, and screenwriter.(b.1938)
 July 18 – Zhao Meng, sculptor.(b.1957)
 July 19 – Yao Lee, Chinese singer (b. 1922)
 July 22 – Li Peng, 4th Premier of the People's Republic of China (b. 1928)
 July 23 – Cao Shuangming, general (b.1930)
 July 28 – Li Jisheng, aerospace engineer (b.1943)
 July 29 – Wang Qidong, materials scientist and politician (b.1921)
 July 30 – Zhao Zhihong, serial killer and rapist (b.1972)
 July 31 – Chen Shunyao, politician and academic administrator (b.1917)

August
 August 1 – Zha Quanxing (b. 1925)
 August 6 – Zhuo Renxi (b. 1931)
 August 12 – Lu Yonggen (b. 1930)
 August 15 – Qin Hanzhang, Chinese engineer, scientist and supercentenarian (b. 1908)
 August 26 – Chen Jiayong (b. 1922)
 August 27 – Zhang Zong (b. 1929)
 August 28 – Nie Yuanzi (b. 1921)
 August 31 – Wang Buxuan (b. 1922)

November
 November 27 – Godfrey Gao, Taiwanese-Canadian model and actor (b. 1984)

See also

References

Links
 

 
2010s in China
Years of the 21st century in China
China
China